Akhmed Avdorkhanov (1973 – 19 September 2005) was a former head of security for Ichkerian President Aslan Maskhadov. 

Officially the Russian state suggested he was killed by Shamil Basayev in a dispute over money or due to ideology, as he opposed the militant Islam of Basayev and his followers, while the Chechen insurgents claim he was killed by Russian forces. 

President Vladimir Putin called Avdorkhanov's death "a turning point", since according to him Avdorkhanov was the last nationalist leader, and the remaining leaders of the Chechen resistance are radical Islamists who will not receive as much support among the local people.

His younger brother Zaurbek served as a field commander in the Caucasus Emirate, and most notably was one of the leaders of the August 2010 raid on Chechen President Ramzan Kadyrov's home village of Tsentoroy. Zaurbek was killed in what is believed to be an accidental explosion in Galashki, Ingushetia on 31 July 2012.

References

1973 births
2005 deaths
Chechen field commanders
Chechen nationalists
People of the Chechen wars
Chechen warlords
Russian people of Chechen descent
Chechen people